Percy Gerald Stewart (18 October 1885 – 15 October 1931) was an Australian  politician.  He was an original member of the Victorian Farmers' Union and long a radical campaigner for farming interests.  He helped bring down Stanley Bruce's government in 1929, but died soon after.

Early life
Stewart was born in the Melbourne suburb of Footscray, Victoria and educated at Yarraville State School.  He worked in Melbourne and western Victoria, including a period as a shepherd, and then went to sea. He gained a master's certificate, but gave up sailing after contracting malaria. He then travelled in Europe and Canada before returning to Australia in 1909.  In 1913, he selected a block of land in the Mallee at Carwarp, but later sold it and moved to another farm at Carwarp West.  In 1916 Stewart married Edith Catherine Roberts.  During World War I, he volunteered three times for military service but was turned down on health grounds.  He worked with the Victorian Department of Agriculture to develop new techniques to improve crops yields in the Mallee.  He bought the Mildura Sunraysia Daily in 1924 and was its chairman until his death.

Political career

Early involvement
Inspired by the Canadian grain growers' associations, Stewart helped found the Victorian Farmers' Union, which eventually developed into the Victorian branch of the Country Party. In September 1916, he was appointed to the VFU's central council and in November 1917 he won the Victorian Legislative Assembly seat of Swan Hill as one of four original VFU members. In parliament, he was highly independent and often voted with the Labor Party.

House of Representatives
Stewart resigned his state seat prior to the October 1919 federal election and won the seat of Wimmera, which he held to his death. He was one of five original members of the VFU in the House of Representatives and took a large part in negotiating the formation of the Bruce–Page coalition government in late 1922, and he became Minister for Works and Railways in the resulting ministry. As minister, he was also president of the River Murray Commission, which allowed him to press for the completion of the Hume Weir. He also helped to establish the irrigated citrus industry along the Murray River. On  28 August 1923, he turned the first sod on the construction of the provisional Parliament House in Canberra.

In August 1924, Stewart resigned his portfolio in protest at a deal between Bruce and Page that protected sitting members from opposition from coalition party candidates at elections, which he regarded as an unwarranted restriction on voters' choice. He and Albert Dunstan then established the Victorian Country Progressive Party, which held the balance of power in the Victorian Legislative Assembly in the late 1920s and sought to establish compulsory nationwide pools and guaranteed prices for wheat. This idea eventually led to the establishment of the Australian Wheat Board. Bruce campaigned against his re-election at the 1928 election and 1929 election, without success. In September 1929, he voted against Bruce's bill to abolish the Commonwealth Court of Conciliation and Arbitration, helping to bring down his government. After the election of the Scullin government in 1929, he worked closely with it and sought reduced tariffs and a range of government interventions to raise rural incomes.

In 1931 Stewart died of pneumonia at Woomelang survived by his wife.

Notes

National Party of Australia members of the Parliament of Australia
Independent members of the Parliament of Australia
Victoria (Australia) state politicians
Members of the Australian House of Representatives for Wimmera
Members of the Australian House of Representatives
Members of the Cabinet of Australia
1885 births
1931 deaths
Country Progressive Party members of the Parliament of Australia
20th-century Australian politicians
People from Footscray, Victoria
Politicians from Melbourne